Tom Coleman may refer to:

Tom Coleman (film producer), founder of Atlantic Entertainment Group
Tom Coleman (Georgia politician) (1928–2014), Georgia state senator
Tom Coleman (Missouri politician) (born 1943), former U.S. Congressman from Missouri

See also  
Thomas Coleman (disambiguation)